

Background 
1558 is a one of the time full of event in kingdom of Sweden, such as in 28 January - Russian began to attack on Livonia starts the Livonian War, also in 28 January February - The King bans the use of oak for anything other than as building material for the royal navy February - The King bans the use of oak for anything other than as building material for the royal navy, Jöran Persson appointed royal secretary, Crown Prince Eric proposes to Elizabeth I of England, and Danviken Hospital is founded. 

Events from the year 1558 in Sweden

Incumbents
 Monarch – Gustav I

Events

 28 January - Russian attack on Livonia starts the Livonian War
 February - The King bans the use of oak for anything other than as building material for the royal navy. 
 Jöran Persson appointed royal secretary.
 Crown Prince Eric proposes to Elizabeth I of England.
 Danviken Hospital is founded.
 A new order of mass, Liturgia eller Then Svenska Messordning, is published in both Latin and Swedish.

Births

 8 March - Gustaf Brahe, official (d. 1615)

Deaths

References

 
Years of the 16th century in Sweden
Sweden